Rawhead Rex is a 1986 Irish fantasy horror film directed by George Pavlou, produced by Kevin Attew and Don Hawkins, and written by Clive Barker, based on his short story of the same name. The story had originally appeared in Vol. 3 of his Books of Blood series. The film focuses on a monstrous pagan deity's bloody rampage through the Irish countryside, with the title alluding to the folklore monster Rawhead. Pavlou and Barker had previously worked together on Transmutations (also known as Underworld).

The film stars David Dukes in the lead role alongside Kelly Piper, Niall Toibin, Cora Venus Lunny and Donal McCann in supporting roles. The film was given a limited release in the United States by Empire Pictures on 17 April 1987.

Plot
Howard Hallenbeck travels to Ireland to research items of religious significance. He goes to a rural church to photograph some graves. During a thunderstorm, lightning strikes a stone column in a field. The monster Rawhead Rex rises from the dirt.

Howard meets Declan O'Brien, who directs him to Reverend Coot. The curious O'Brien approaches the altar and places his hand on it. Images flash before his eyes. This experience destroys O'Brien's sanity. Howard inquires about the church's parish records. Coot says he can arrange to have Howard look at them, but finds they have been stolen. O'Brien destroys his camera.

A man arrives at the home of locals Dennis and Jenny. He discovers a traumatized Jenny. Police arrive. Rawhead drags Dennis's dead body through the forest and comes upon a trailer park. There he kills a teenager named Andy Johnson.

On the road again, Howard pulls over to let his daughter urinate by a tree. Hearing her scream, Howard and his wife rush to her; Howard's son stays in the van, alone. Rawhead kills Howard's son and takes the body into the woods. Infuriated by the police's unsuccessful efforts to track down Rawhead, Howard returns to the church. He discovers that there is a weapon shown in the stained glass window that can be used to defeat the monster. After Howard leaves, Coot curiously touches the altar but resists the temptations and images it shows him.

Rawhead arrives at the church to "baptize" O'Brien by urinating on him. A bewildered Coot goes outside to investigate the noise and sees Rawhead. Horrified, Coot flees inside the church and into the basement while Rawhead destroys everything inside. Coot finds the missing parish records, showing what appears to be some kind of blueprint of Rawhead. O'Brien catches Coot and forces him upstairs to be sacrificed to Rawhead. The police arrive at the church, but hesitate to open fire on Rawhead because he is carrying Coot. The brainwashed inspector dumps gasoline around the police cars and ignites it as they begin to shoot at Rawhead, killing all the police, including himself.

Howard leaves his wife and daughter and goes back to the church, where a dying Coot tells him that Rawhead is afraid of something in the altar. Howard goes inside. O'Brien is burning books and is overpowered by Howard. Howard, by using a candle stick, opens the altar and gets to the weapon. O'Brien retreats to Rawhead to tell him. Howard tries to use the weapon, but it has no effect. In anger, Rawhead kills O'Brien by tearing out his throat.

As Rawhead tries to kill Howard, Howard's wife picks up the weapon. A ray of light comes out of the weapon and hits Rawhead, stopping Rawhead from killing Howard. Howard realizes that the weapon works only when wielded by a woman. The form of a woman appears from the stone and shoots electric rays through the stones and into Rawhead's body, knocking him to the ground. After more blasts, Rawhead is drained, allowing Howard to hit him with a shovel. Rawhead then falls through the ground and Howard's wife drops the weapon in with him. Rawhead is smashed under giant stones. Both Howard and his wife weep in light of it being over.

The boy from the trailer park places flowers on Andy Johnson's grave. As he walks away, Rawhead emerges from the ground and roars.

Cast
 David Dukes as Howard Hallenbeck
 Kelly Piper as Elaine Hallenbeck
 Ronan Wilmott as Declan O'Brien
 Niall Toibin as Reverend Coot
 Niall O'Brien as Detective Inspector Isaac Gissing
 Hugh O'Conor as Robbie Hallenbeck
 Cora Lunny as Minty Hallenbeck
 Heinrich von Schellendorf as Rawhead Rex
 Donal McCann as Tom Garron

Release
The film was given a limited release theatrically in the United States by Empire Pictures in 1987. It was later released on VHS by Vestron Video that same year.

The film was released on DVD in the US by Geneon on 5 October 1999. It was re-released by Prism on 29 July 2003. A 4K resolution restoration of Rawhead Rex, based on the original camera negative, was released on Blu-ray and DVD by Kino Lorber on 17 October 2017.

Reception
Rawhead Rex has a 29% approval rating on Rotten Tomatoes and an average rating of 4.4/10 based on eight critics. Cinefantastique gave the film a negative review, criticizing the design of the title monster as being more laughable than frightening, and the film's dull finale.

Barker has said that while he feels the movie is essentially faithful to his story, he is dissatisfied with it. In an interview less than a year after the film's release, he explained, "I think, generally speaking, the movie followed the beats of the screenplay. It's just that monster movies, by and large, are made by directorial 'oomph' rather than what's in the screenplay. I'd like to think the screenplay for Rawhead Rex had the possibility of having major thrills in it. I don't think it was quite pulled off." In a 2004 interview, Barker said he wanted to do a remake of the film, but nothing further came of this.

References

External links
 
 
 

1986 films
1986 horror films
1980s British films
1980s English-language films
1980s exploitation films
1980s monster movies
British monster movies
British supernatural horror films
Empire International Pictures films
Films based on short fiction
Films based on works by Clive Barker
Films scored by Colin Towns
Films shot in County Wicklow
Folk horror films
Irish horror films